"Tie Up My Hands" is the second single by Australian rock group, British India, taken from their debut album Guillotine (June 2007). During 2007, it reached the top of the chart on jtv's countdown show, and was listed at No. 46 on the Triple J Hottest 100, 2007.

Track listing

Release history

References

External links
 Watch "Tie Up My Hands" on YouTube

British India (band) songs
2007 singles
Song recordings produced by Harry Vanda
2006 songs